Aref Gholizadeh (born in Tabriz, Iran), was a former Iranian football player. He played for Iran national football team in 1951 Asian Games and 1958 Asian Games.

He died in April 2015.

Club career
He previously played for the Taj until 1962.

Honours
Iran
Asian Games Silver medal: 1951

References

External links

 Aref Gholizadeh at TeamMelli.com

Iranian footballers
Iran international footballers
Esteghlal F.C. players
Footballers from Baku
Asian Games silver medalists for Iran
Asian Games medalists in football
Footballers at the 1951 Asian Games
Medalists at the 1951 Asian Games
Footballers at the 1958 Asian Games
1938 births
2015 deaths
Association football defenders